45 is the debut album of the Soviet rock band Kino. It was recorded in 1982 in the AnTrop studio belonging to Andrei Tropillo and distributed as magnitizdat. At the time, Kino consisted of Viktor Tsoi and Aleksei Rybin. Boris Grebenshchikov provided additional instrumentation and musical production. Other members of Akvarium also helped with recording.

Track listing

Personnel

Kino 
 Viktor Tsoi – vocals, guitar, bass guitar
 Aleksei Rybin – guitar

Akvarium 
 Boris Grebenshchikov – guitar, glockenspiel , backing vocals
 Mikhail Vasil'ev – drum machine , backing vocals
 Vsevolod Gakkel' – cello
 Andrei Romanov – flute

Additional personnel 
 Andrei Tropillo – flute, backing vocals

References

External links 
 45 on Discogs

Soviet rock music
Kino (band) albums
1982 debut albums
1982 in the Soviet Union